Velike Livade may refer to:
A former name of Aleksandrovo (Nova Crnja)
A former name of a village taken over by the Majdanpek mines industrial complex